Wolverhampton RLFC are a rugby league team based in the city of Wolverhampton, West Midlands, England. They currently play in the Midlands Rugby League. The team was formed in 2010 from the merger of Wolverhampton Wizards and Wolverhampton Warlords.

Club honours

 RLC West Midlands Division: 2005 (as Wolverhampton Wizards)

Juniors 

Formed and set up in 2011, Wolverhampton Wasps take part in the Midlands Junior League. They are the brain child of former Sheffield Eagles player Daniel Poulton. Wolverhampton Wasps in 2012 continued their growth by fielding multiple teams at various ages including a girls' section.

Rugby League Conference teams
Sport in Wolverhampton
Rugby clubs established in 2010
Rugby league teams in the West Midlands (county)